Gert Uebeler (born 15 March 1957) is a German rower who competed for East Germany.

Uebeler was born in 1957 and grew up in Dessau. He was junior men's coxed pair world champion in 1974. He was twice world champion alongside Jürgen Pfeiffer in coxed pair. At the 1978 World Rowing Championships at Lake Karapiro, New Zealand, they became world champions with Olaf Beyer as coxswain. They defended their title at the 1979 World Rowing Championships in Bled, Yugoslavia, with Georg Spohr as coxswain.

References

1957 births
Living people
East German male rowers
World Rowing Championships medalists for East Germany